The Kentucky Rifles were a professional minor league baseball team located in southeastern Kentucky, United States, playing in the independent Frontier League from 1993 to 1994. The team split their home games between Central Park in Paintsville and Pikeville Athletic Field in Pikeville. The team folded at the conclusion of the 1994 season.

Seasons
1993:  27–23  1st Place Eastern Division (No Playoff)
1994:  24–41  3rd Place Southern Division

References

Defunct Frontier League teams
Defunct baseball teams in Kentucky
Professional baseball teams in Kentucky
1993 establishments in Kentucky
1994 disestablishments in Kentucky
Baseball teams established in 1993
Defunct independent baseball league teams
Baseball teams disestablished in 1994
Pikeville, Kentucky
Paintsville, Kentucky